Qarlujeh (also Romanized as Qārlūjeh; also known as Qārūjeh) is a village in Garamduz Rural District, Garamduz District, Khoda Afarin County, East Azerbaijan Province, Iran. At the 2006 census, its population was 546, in 115 families.

References 

Populated places in Khoda Afarin County